The Mount Elliot mulch-skink (Glaphyromorphus clandestinus)  is a species of skink found in Queensland in Australia.

References

Glaphyromorphus
Reptiles described in 2004
Taxa named by Conrad J. Hoskin
Taxa named by Patrick J. Couper